The Battle of Jit Gadhi (sometimes referred to as Jit Gadh) was fought in 1814 in Jit Gadhi, Lumbini Province between Nepal and the East India Company.

It resulted in Nepalese victory. The battle was commanded by Ujir Singh Thapa and John Sullivan Wood.

References

Further reading 

 
 
 

Conflicts in 1814
Battles involving Nepal
Battles involving the British East India Company
Anglo-Nepalese War
1814 in Nepal
History of Lumbini Province